The DelFly is a fully controllable camera-equipped flapping wing Micro Air Vehicle or Ornithopter developed at the Micro Air Vehicle Lab of the Delft University of Technology  in collaboration with Wageningen University.

The DelFly project focuses on fully functioning systems and follows a top-down approach toward ever smaller and more autonomous flapping wing MAVs.

The DelFly Micro with its 10 cm wing span and 3.07 grams is the smallest free flying controllable flapping 
wing MAV equipped with a camera and video transmitter. Smaller flapping wing MAVs exist, but then without an onboard camera. In particular, a hobbyist from Albany NY, built a flapping 
wing MAV of 920 mg and just 60mm wing span, which is the world's smallest free flying flapper till date.

The 28 centimeter 16 gram DelFly II was capable of vertical take-off and landing and demonstrated simplified forms of autonomous flight, mainly using off-board processing.

The DelFly Explorer measures 28 centimeter while weighing 20 grams and is equipped with a miniature stereo vision system for autonomous flight in buildings.

The DelFly Nimble is a very agile, tailless flapping wing MAV. It steers by modifying the motions of its wings, which allows it to perform high-speed maneuvers such as 360-degree flips. One of its uses is in studying insect flight; mimicking the extremely fast escape maneuvers of fruit flies revealed a new aerodynamic mechanism that helps to make rapid banked turns. The startup company Flapper Drones is developing a commercial version of the DelFly Nimble for applications within the entertainment sector (drone shows, festivals, theme parks).

History
The DelFly project started in 2005 as a Design Synthesis Exercise for a group of Bachelor of Science students at the Faculty of Aerospace Engineering of the TU Delft. The flapping wing design was mentored by Wageningen University, the remote control and micro camera integration by Ruijsink Dynamic Engineering, and the real-time image processing by the TU Delft. The result of this exercise was the DelFly I, a 50 cm wingspan, 21 grams flapping wing MAV equipped with a camera. The DelFly I was 
able to fly both fast and perform slow hovering flight while providing reasonably stable camera images.

In 2007, the DelFly II was created: a 28 cm wing span 16 gram flapping wing MAV equipped with onboard camera. This version was not only smaller, but it had a much broader flight envelope ranging from 7 m/s forward flight to near hovering flight and even backward flight at -1 m/s. In contrast to the DelFly I, the DelFly II could take-off and land vertically. The flight time of the DelFly II was around 15 minutes.

The DelFly II was followed in 2008 by the DelFly Micro, a 10 cm wing span, 3.07 gram flapping wing MAV, also equipped with camera. The DelFly Micro 
is fully steerable with 3 controls for the throttle, elevator and rudder. Given the limited onboard energy, the flight time of the DelFly Micro was around 2 to 3 minutes. The DelFly Micro featured in the Guinness book of records 2009 as the smallest airplane in the world equipped with a camera.

The DelFly participated in the 2005, 2007, 2008, 2010 and 2013 editions of the Micro Air Vehicle Competitions and was the first vehicle to demonstrate fully autonomous indoor flight.

The DelFly Explorer was created in 2013. It has a stereo vision system that allows autonomous obstacle avoidance even in unknown and unprepared environments.

The DelFly Nimble, presented in 2018, is the first tailless DelFly. It is much more agile than earlier designs; it can hover and fly in any direction up until 7 m/s in forward flight. It has a relatively simple design and is based on commercially of the shelf components and 3D printed parts.

In 2019, a technological spinoff of the Delft University of Technology Flapper Drones developing a commercial version of the DelFly Nimble was founded.

Influence
The DelFly is based on scaling relations for the aerodynamic design of flapping wings, which were discovered in the Dickinson lab at Caltech in collaboration with Wageningen University. Earlier research in the Dickinson lab also inspired The Robobee, both the Robobee and the DelFly design originated from research with robot models of flying insects. The DelFly influenced the TechJect Dragonfly UAV and FlyTech Dragonfly among many others refer to DelFly developments.

Design challenges
The design of autonomous, light-weight, less than 20 grams flapping wing MAVs poses challenges in various domains, including materials, electronics, control, aerodynamics, computer vision and artificial intelligence. All these domains feed into each other. For example, studies on the design and aerodynamics of the wings have enhanced the efficiency of flight and the amount of generated lift. This allows for a larger payload to be taken on board, such as more onboard sensors and processing. In turn, such onboard processing can be used to perform automatic maneuvers in a wind tunnel, helping to create better models the DelFly and its low Reynolds aerodynamics.

Applications
Flapping wing MAVs have a natural appearance and are inherently safe by means of their low weight and low speeds of the wings. This makes them particularly suitable for indoor flight, also in the presence of humans. Further, flapping wing MAVs can be used as (augmented reality) toys, but other possible applications include inspection of indoor industrial structures or video streaming of the crowd during indoor events. The DelFly flies well indoors with the air conditioning turned off, and outdoors under very low wind conditions.

The exceptional flight capabilities of the DelFly Nimble, combined with its inherent safety and natural appearance, opened up new applications within the entertainment sector. The startup company Flapper Drones is developing the technology further for drone shows during concerts, festivals and within theme parks.

References

2013 robots
Unmanned aerial vehicles of the Netherlands
Robotic animals
Ornithopters
Audiovisual introductions in 2005
Micro robots
Aerial photography